George D. Brown was a 20th-century architect who designed several historically significant bus stations for Greyhound Lines, including the Greyhound Bus Depot (Columbia, South Carolina) and the Atlantic Greyhound Bus Terminal station in Savannah, Georgia. Both of these stations are listed on the National Register of Historic Places for their architecture.

Career
Practicing in Charleston, West Virginia, he designed stations in the Streamline Moderne style. He also designed the Greyhound station for state capitols in Charleston, West Virginia and on 412 E. Broad Street in Richmond, Virginia.

Streamline Moderne Buildings Designed by George D. Brown

References

Architects from Charleston, West Virginia
Art Deco architects
Streamline Moderne architects
20th-century American architects

Year of birth missing
Year of death missing